David Urwitz (born 1973) is a Swedish singer and musician.

He grew up in Trollhättan but resides in Masthugget, Gothenburg. Urwitz releases his music on his own record label Alvy Singer Records. For his albums, he collaborated with producers like Andreas Dahlbäck, Hans Olsson Brookes and Daniel Claesson. He also collaborated with other singers like Anna Maria Espinosa, Helene Bøksle and Irma Schultz Keller.

Discography

Albums

Singles

Non-charting singles
2001: "Jag var som du"
2010: "Hos mig" (Helene Bøksle)
2011: "Kasta sten”
2012: "Fråga någon som vet"

Promotional singles
2005: "Sjung för mig" (Promosingle)
2005: "Allt jag sa" (Promosingle)
2005: "Jag gör vad som helst" (Promosingle)
2007: "Enkelt" (Promosingle)

References

External links
Official website

1973 births
Living people
People from Trollhättan
21st-century Swedish singers
21st-century Swedish male singers